Dairy Farmers, Inc. (DFI) is Florida’s milk promotion organization, enhancing the industry's image and increasing milk and dairy product sales statewide via marketing and education.

Related links
 Official Website
 National Dairy Council Website

American dairy organizations